Octorara Junior-Senior High School is the only secondary school in the Octorara Area School District. It is located between Atglen and Cochranville in Chester County, Pennsylvania, United States
It serves two counties (Lancaster and Chester) one of the only schools like this in the U.S.A.

External links
 Octorara Junior-Senior High School
 Octorara Area School District

References

Public high schools in Pennsylvania
Schools in Chester County, Pennsylvania